Dabba may refer to:

 Dabba or tiffin carrier, a lunch box used in South Asia
 The Lunchbox, working title Dabba, a 2013 Indian film
 Dabba (company), a South African telco company
 ∂, a mathematical symbol
 Beast of the Earth, or Dabbat al-Ardḍ, an apocalyptic creature in Islam

See also 
 Dhaba, the name for a roadside restaurant in South Asia
 Daba (disambiguation)
 Dabbas (disambiguation)
 Yabba Dabba Doo (disambiguation)